The Manipulators was a Canadian drama television series which aired on CBC Television from 1970 to 1971.

Premise
Parole officers and their clients were featured characters in this colour filmed series. Its working title was The Double Bind, reflecting the dual responsibilities of parole officers to both former prisoners and the legal system. The production was based on The Clients, a pilot half-hour series broadcast locally in Vancouver.

Cast
 Marc Strange as Rick Nicholson
 Roxanne Irwin as Maggie Campbell
 Gregory Nash as Campbell's son
 Al Kozlik as Bill
 Anthony Holland as Clem
 Dorothy Davies as the staff psychologist

Scheduling
This hour-long series was broadcast on Wednesdays at 8:30 p.m. (Eastern) for five episodes from 28 January to 25 February 1970 for its first season. Its second and final season aired seven episodes on Sundays at 9:00 p.m. from 31 January to 14 March 1971. Episodes were rebroadcast from 25 July to 5 September 1971.

Episodes

Season 1
 "The Spike in the Wall", starring Linda Goranson, Jace Vander Veen (Daryl Duke director)
 "Where There Is Fear" (Don Eccleston director)
 "Now I Lay Me Down To Sleep" (Daryl Duke director)

Season 2

 "Turn to the Wind", starring Jace Vander Veen
 "The Code", starring Joseph Golland, Ted Rekert
 "Bell And Bonnie, Bonnie And Bell", starring Rae Brown, Judy De Moor, Ivor Harris
 "X-Kalay", starring Margot Kidder

Awards
Linda Goranson won the Canadian Film Award for Best Actress in a Non-Feature at the 22nd Canadian Film Awards for the episode "The Spike in the Wall". Her performance, in which her character removed her blouse to attract her husband's attention, was controversial as the first topless scene ever broadcast on Canadian network television.

References

External links
 
 

CBC Television original programming
1970 Canadian television series debuts
1971 Canadian television series endings
1970s Canadian drama television series